R0 or R00 may refer to:

 Haplogroup R0 (mtDNA)
 Brussels Ring, a road in Belgium
 Basic reproduction number (R0), in epidemiology
 Net reproduction rate (R0), in population ecology and demography
 .r00, a software file extension
 Samsung YP-R0, a digital audio player

See also
 RO (disambiguation)